Jamaican Country Sign Language, also Country Sign, or Konchri Sain (KS) in Jamaican Patois, is an indigenous village sign language of Jamaica. It is used by a small number of Deaf and hearing Jamaicans, spread over several communities in the rural south-western parish of St. Elizabeth.

The introduction of formal education for the St. Elizabeth deaf in 1975 by American Mennonite missionaries introduced two additional signed systems which have negatively affected KS: Signed English and American Sign Language. School officials strongly discouraged the use of the language inside and outside the classroom, resulting in a significant reduction in the number of fluent KS signers and a dramatic decline in the language's prestige. Thus, by 1985, KS was used primarily by elderly monolingual Deaf community members, while other community members used Jamaican Sign Language, a dialect of American Sign Language.

In 2007 it was estimated that the language would become extinct in the next twenty to thirty years, if deliberate effort was not taken to save it by means of an effective language planning strategy. The University of the West Indies in conjunction with the University of Central London had already begun working on a language documentation project for the language. A 2011 sociolinguistic survey reported that there were deaf adult KS signers on the island in 2009.

Notes

References 
Cumberbatch, Keren., Adone, Dany., et al. (2012). Colour signs in two indigenous sign languages. In "Sign Languages in Village Communities: Subtitle: Anthropological and Linguistic Insights," edited by Connie De Vos and Ulrike Zeshan, pp. 53–86. (Series Title: Sign Language Typology 4). Berlin: De Gruyter Mouton. Available (in part) online: google books.
Cumberbatch, Keren., (2012). "Sociolinguistic sketch of Konchri Sain." In Sign Languages in Village Communities: Subtitle: Anthropological and Linguistic Insights, edited by Connie De Vos and Ulrike Zeshan, pp. 387–394. (Series Title: Sign Language Typology 4). Berlin: De Gruyter Mouton. 
Parks, Elizabeth., Epley, Christina., et al. (2011). A Sociolinguistic Profile of the Jamaican Deaf Community. SIL International.  SIL Electronic Survey.
Zeshan, Ulrike. (2007). The ethics of documenting sign languages in village communities. In Peter K. Austin, Oliver Bond & David Nathan (eds) Proceedings of Conference on Language Documentation and Linguistic Theory. London: SOAS. pp. 269–279.
Dolman, D., (1986). Sign Languages in Jamaica. In "Sign Language Studies." no 52. pp 235–242.
Dolman, D., (1985).  "The Language of St. Elizabeth's Deaf Community." In Jamaica Journal. 18(4). pp 10–15.

External links
 Ethnologue Entry on Konchri Sain
 Map of St. Elizabeth Parish
 The Jamaica Association for the Deaf's KS page

Sign language isolates
Endangered sign language isolates
Sign languages of Jamaica
Village sign languages